Naga Hills District may refer to:

 Hkamti District, a district in far northern Sagaing Division of Burma
 Naga Hills District, British India, that was later merged with Tuensang to form the Indian state of Nagaland

See also:

 Naga District, Mie, a district in Mie, Japan
 Naga District, Wakayama, a former district in Wakayama, Japan

See also
Naga (disambiguation)